Jill Hetherington-Hultquist (born October 27, 1964) is a Canadian former professional tennis player. She played college tennis for the University of Florida, and was women's tennis head coach at the University of Washington until May 2014.

College career
Born in Brampton, Ontario, Hetherington attended the University of Florida in Gainesville, Florida, where she played for coach Andy Brandi's Florida Gators women's tennis team from 1984 to 1987. While playing for the Gators, she won four straight Southeastern Conference (SEC) singles championships, three as the team's No. 2 singles player, and once as the No. 1 singles player. She also won three consecutive SEC doubles championships from 1985 to 1987. Hultquist was recognized as a four-time first-team All-SEC selection and received four All-American honors. She was inducted into the University of Florida Athletic Hall of Fame as a "Gator Great" in 1999.

Professional career
After turning professional, she won one singles title and fourteen doubles titles on the WTA Tour during her career. Her best Grand Slam results were reaching the women's doubles final at the 1988 US Open and the 1989 Australian Open, and the mixed doubles final at the 1995 French Open.

Grand Slam finals

Doubles: 2 runner-ups

Mixed doubles: 1 runner-up

WTA career finals

Singles: 1 title

Doubles: 34 (14 titles, 20 runner-ups)

ITF finals

Singles (1–0)

Doubles (6–1)

Performance timelines

Singles

Doubles

Mixed doubles

See also

Florida Gators
List of Florida Gators tennis players
List of University of Florida alumni
List of University of Florida Athletic Hall of Fame members
List of University of Florida Olympians
Washington Huskies

References

External links
 
 
 
 Profile at SLAM Sports
 GoHuskies.com Profile

1964 births
Living people
Canadian female tennis players
Florida Gators women's tennis players
Olympic tennis players of Canada
Sportspeople from Brampton
Racket sportspeople from Ontario
Tennis players at the 1984 Summer Olympics
Tennis players at the 1988 Summer Olympics
Tennis players at the 1996 Summer Olympics
Universiade medalists in tennis
Universiade gold medalists for Canada
Medalists at the 1983 Summer Universiade